Brawley Union High School (BUHS) is a high school in Brawley, California.

Clubs
Campus Life
Associated Student Body
Theatre/Drama
Friday Night Live
California Scholastic Federation
Travel Club
Fortnite club (actual club)
Future Teachers of America
 Future Farmers of America
Varsity B
Mock Trial
Bilingual Civics Club
Track
Publications
Mat Maids
Junior State of America
Brawley Community Service Club
Tech Club
HOSA (Health Occupations Students of America) Club
Wildcat Rugrat Club
Brawley Community Service Club
Humanitarian Club
Journalism
Chess Club
Conflict Simulation

Athletics 
The wrestling program has won 18 consecutive CIF San Diego Section titles (2001–2018) and 2 Southern Section titles (1969, 1970).

The bell game, an annual football game with their rival school,  Central Union High in  El Centro, is a valley-wide event. Brawley leads the series 43-23.

The bell is real and came off of a boat in 1944.

Notable alumni
 Mike Mohamed, Class of 2006, NFL linebacker; sixth-round pick and No. 189 overall in the 2011 NFL Draft.
 Sid Monge, Class of 1970, MLB Pitcher (1975-1984)
 Sergio Romo, Class of 2001, MLB pitcher for the Seattle Mariners
 Jake Sanchez, Mexican League Baseball pitcher 
 Rudy Seánez, Class of 1986, MLB pitcher (1989–2008)

References

External links
School website
BUHS on Wikimapia
California Standardized Testing and Reporting (STAR) Program test results 

High schools in Imperial County, California
Brawley, California
Public high schools in California